Torsten Wiegel (born 25 April 1967) is a German swimmer. He competed in two events at the 1988 Summer Olympics representing West Germany.

References

1967 births
Living people
German male swimmers
Olympic swimmers of West Germany
Swimmers at the 1988 Summer Olympics
Sportspeople from Dortmund